Death Cult Armageddon is the sixth studio album by Norwegian symphonic black metal band Dimmu Borgir,  released on 9 September 2003. It has since sold over 100,000 copies in the United States; the first album under Nuclear Blast to do so; and debuted on the Billboard 200 chart at number 169. The song "Progenies of the Great Apocalypse"  was released as a single with an accompanying music video. This would also be the last album to have Nicholas Barker on drums.

The artwork within the album,  done by Swiss artist Joachim Luetke, displays what appears to be an industrial factory, inside of which the band members are living out their fantasies, some of which are similar to scenes seen in the music video for "Progenies of the Great Apocalypse". Most of the songs have a common apocalyptic theme.

Release history
Death Cult Armageddon saw initial release on CD, vinyl and DVD-Audio on 9 September 2003 under Nuclear Blast, the DVD-Audio edition featuring all three bonus tracks, the "Progenies of the Great Apocalypse" music video and photo galleries, which later featured on the Ozzfest edition bonus disc, and the Digipack editions featured the Bathory cover "Satan My Master". The Chinese edition was later released on 3 November 2003 and the Japanese edition was released the following month on 23 December 2003 with the orchestral bonus tracks.

Track listing

Personnel

 Dimmu Borgir
Shagrath – lead vocals
Silenoz – rhythm guitar
Galder – lead guitar
ICS Vortex – bass, clean vocals on tracks 2 & 7
Mustis – grand piano & synth
Nicholas Barker – drums

 Guests
 Abbath Doom Occulta – backing vocals on "Progenies of the Great Apocalypse" & "Heavenly Perverse"
 Orchestration arranged by Gaute Storås
 Recorded with the Prague Philharmonic Orchestra (tracks 1–2, 4–7, 9–11)
 Conducted by Adam Klemens
 Charlie Storm – additional synthetics, sample assistance

 Technical staff
Fredrik Nordström & Shagrath – Mixing,  engineering, Producer
Patrik Sten – assistant engineering
Arnold Linberg – assistant engineering
Peter in de Detou – mastering
Joachim Luetke – cover-concept, artwork
Alf Børjesson – Group shots

Footnotes

2003 albums
Dimmu Borgir albums
Albums recorded at Studio Fredman
Nuclear Blast albums
Albums produced by Fredrik Nordström